Meyah (Meax) is a West Papuan language spoken in Miyah District, Tambrauw Regency of West Papua, Indonesia. The Meyah language is agglutinative and head-marking and has no grammatical cases. It has subject-verb-object word order, which comes from nearby Austronesian languages.

Distribution
Within Tambrauw Regency, ethnic Meyah people reside in Senopi District, Miyah District, Fef District, and Syujak District.

Phonology 
Meax has 5 vowels and 13 consonants.

Pitch-accent 
Like many other Papuan languages of the Bird's Head Peninsula, Meyah is a pitch-accent language with two phonemic pitch levels: rising high and falling high, which contrast.

Grammar

Pronouns 
Pronouns demonstrate three numbers: singular, dual, and plural. The first person dual and plural pronouns also demonstrate clusivity.

These prefixes are used for verbs, body parts and kinship terms.

Nouns 
Nouns in Meyah are divided into two types: alienable and inalienable, the latter of which includes terms for body parts and kinship relations, and are obligatorily marked for possessor. With alienable nouns, there is morphological complexity. The plural marker '-ir' can only be used with humans, pigs, and dogs. There is no other method of indicating plurality for other alienable nouns. For inanimate nouns, a plurality may be indicated by certain modifiers such as mod ofokou 'house many' or mod efaga orgomu 'house CLF three.'

Kinship 
Kinship terms, as inalienable nouns, share the same possessor prefixes as body parts and verb stems, however, they differ in the singular possessive prefixes. Instead of the '(C)i-' prefix found on first and second singular prefixes, kinship terms have 'ed-.' (1st singular) and 'eb-' (2nd singular). On verbs and other inalienable nouns, the third person singular possessive prefix is normally unmarked, but kinship terms use the same prefix as the first person plural exclusive, 'me-.' Terms for important kinship relations have divergent morphology, like the lack of a first-person singular possessive prefix for father 'akeina' and mother 'ameina,' which are also used to refer to father and mothers' brothers respectively.

Classes 
There are six classes of nouns, which are differentiated on the basis of their classifier when they are modified by a numeral. The first class is a class used exclusively for humans. Classes two and three relate to food, with the former being for food growing underground and the latter being for food growing on trees and vines. When this food is removed from trees or vines, it is classified according to whether it is 'round,' placed in the fourth class, and 'flat,' found in the fifth class. Class six consists of terms for animals and 'house.'

References

Further reading 

Languages of western New Guinea
Mantion–Meax languages